This is a list of 2013 box office number-one films in China (only Mainland China).

References

See also
 List of Chinese films of 2013

China
 List
2013